William John Root (born September 6, 1959) is a Canadian retired professional ice hockey defenceman who played six seasons in the National Hockey League (NHL) with the Montreal Canadiens, Toronto Maple Leafs, St. Louis Blues and Philadelphia Flyers between 1982 and 1988. As a youth, he played in the 1972 Quebec International Pee-Wee Hockey Tournament with a minor ice hockey team from Toronto.

Career statistics

Regular season and playoffs

References

External links
 

1959 births
Living people
Canadian ice hockey defencemen
Ice hockey people from Toronto
Montreal Canadiens players
Niagara Falls Flyers players
Newmarket Saints players
Nova Scotia Voyageurs players
Philadelphia Flyers players
St. Catharines Saints players
St. Louis Blues players
Toronto Maple Leafs players
Undrafted National Hockey League players